Dustin Michael White is an American politician serving as a member of the Maine House of Representatives from the 146th district. He assumed office on December 3, 2014.

Background 
White lives in Mars Hill, Maine. He studied pre-law at Husson University. Outside of politics, White works as a logistics broker. He was elected to the Maine House of Representatives in November 2014 and assumed office on December 3, 2014. White also served as ranking member of the House Elections Committee.

References 

Living people
People from Aroostook County, Maine
Republican Party members of the Maine House of Representatives
21st-century American politicians
Year of birth missing (living people)